Tom Holliday is an American college baseball coach, and the current manager of the Chatham Anglers in the Cape Cod Baseball League. Holliday was named the Anglers manager on August 10, 2017, following 40 consecutive years as either a head coach or assistant coach in Division One college baseball from 1976–2015, during which his teams made 17 College World Series appearances and won two NCAA National Championships (Arizona State in 1977 & Texas in 2005).

Holliday spent 26 of his 40 years as an NCAA baseball coach at Oklahoma State University, where he was the head coach from 1997 to 2003. Those seven seasons represent Holliday's only collegiate head coaching experience, highlighted by a College World Series appearance in 1999. Before that, he was Oklahoma State's pitching coach and recruiting coordinator for 19 years, from 1978 to 1996.

Holliday was the pitching coach at the University of Texas from 2004 to 2006, and was part of the Longhorns' 2005 National Championship team. He then became the pitching coach and associate head coach at North Carolina State University from 2007–2014. Holliday's final season coaching an NCAA baseball program was in 2015, when he spent one year as the pitching coach at Auburn University.

The Chatham Anglers of the Cape Cod Baseball League named Holliday their manager on August 10, 2017. Holliday succeeded John Schiffner, the winningest manager in league history, who retired after 25 years as Chatham's manager following the 2017 season to become an assistant coach at the University of Maine.

Both of Holliday's sons are prominent baseball figures. His younger son, Matt Holliday, is a veteran Major League outfielder and a 2011 World Series Champion with the St. Louis Cardinals. Older son Josh Holliday is the head baseball coach at Oklahoma State University.

Head coaching record

References

External links
Tom Holliday Biography at Oklahoma State Cowboy Baseball official website.

Living people
1953 births
Arizona State Sun Devils baseball coaches
Cape Cod Baseball League coaches
Miami Hurricanes baseball players
NC State Wolfpack baseball coaches
Oklahoma State Cowboys baseball coaches
Texas Longhorns baseball coaches
Yavapai Roughriders baseball players